Grilli is a surname; notable people with the name include:

Francesca Grilli (born 1978), Italian visual artist 
Guido Grilli (born 1939) baseball relief pitcher
Jason Grilli (born 1976), baseball relief pitcher
Paolo Grilli (1857–1952), Italian sculptor and painter
Rodrigo-Antonio Grilli (born 1979), Brazilian tennis player
Steve Grilli (born 1949), baseball pitcher, father of Jason
Vittorio Grilli (born 1957), Italian economist and academic